Barra da Lagoa is a small fishing village in the city of Florianópolis, Santa Catarina, Brazil. The village is set on the mouth of a tidewater channel that flows in and out of the Island's sizable lagoon, the Lagoa da Conceição. The channel is at the end of a long beach made up of Praia Barra da Lagoa (English:Barra da Lagoa Beach) and Mozambique Beach which form a single 14 km stretch of beach.

Barra da Lagoa is home to a turtle preservation centre operated by Projeto TAMAR.

References

Neighbourhoods in Florianópolis
Beaches of Florianópolis